The village of Dishu (also Deshu, Deh Šu) is the center of Dishu District in Helmand Province, Afghanistan. The population was 9,482 according to calculations for 2007.

See also
 Helmand Province

References

Populated places in Helmand Province